Butman can refer to:

People
 Igor Butman, jazz saxophonist
 John Butman (1951–2020), American writer
 Oleg Butman (born 1966), Russian jazz drummer
 Samuel Butman, American politician
 Shmuel Butman, Chabad rabbi

Places in the United States
 Butman Corners, Wisconsin
 Butman Township, Michigan

See also
 Buttman
 Buttmann